Corail is a commune in the Corail Arrondissement, in the Grand'Anse department of Haiti. It has 22,021 inhabitants.

Locations within Corail commune include:
Corail, D'lagon, Fond Roge, Gros Basin, Layon Fon, Miyu, Nan Miel and Troupeau.

References

Populated places in Grand'Anse (department)
Communes of Haiti